The Lotus Elite name has been used for two production vehicles and one concept vehicle developed and manufactured by British automobile manufacturer Lotus Cars. The first generation Elite Type 14 was produced from 1957 until 1963 and the second generation model (Type 75 and later Type 83) from 1974 until 1982. The Elite name was also applied to a concept vehicle unveiled in 2010.

Type 14 (1957–1963)

The first generation of the Elite or Lotus Type 14 was a light weight two-seater coupé produced from 1957 until 1963.

The car debuted at the 1957 London Motor Car Show, Earls Court bearing chassis number #1008. The Elite had spent a year in development, aided by "carefully selected racing customers" before going on sale.

The Elite's most distinctive feature was its highly innovative fibreglass monocoque construction, in which a stressed-skin Glass reinforced plastic unibody replaced the previously separate chassis and body components. Unlike the contemporary Chevrolet Corvette, which used fibreglass for only exterior bodywork, the Elite used glass-reinforced plastic for the entire load-bearing structure of the car. A steel subframe for supporting the engine and front suspension was bonded into the front of the monocoque, as was a square-section windscreen-hoop that provided mounting points for door hinges, a jacking point for lifting the car and roll-over protection components. The first 250 body units were made by Maximar Mouldings at Pulborough, Sussex. The body construction caused numerous early problems, until manufacture was handed over to Bristol Aeroplane Company.

The resultant body was lighter, stiffer, and provided better driver protection in the event of a crash. Still, a full understanding of the engineering qualities of fibreglass-reinforced plastic was several years off and the suspension attachment points were regularly observed to pull out of the fibreglass structure. All production Elites were powered by the FWE engine, except for one that was fitted with the newly developed Lotus-Ford Twin Cam engine. The FWE engine was derived from a lightweight high-capacity water pump engine used for firefighting.

The car had independent suspension all round with transverse wishbones at the front and Chapman struts at the rear. The rear struts were so long, that they poked up in the back and the tops could be seen through the rear window. The Series 2 cars, with Bristol-built bodies, had triangulated trailing radius arms for improved toe-in control. Girling disc brakes, usually without servo assistance, of  diameter were used, inboard at the rear. When leaving the factory the Elite was originally fitted with Pirelli Cinturato 155HR15 tyres.

Advanced aerodynamics also contributed to the car's low drag coefficient of  considering the engineers did not enjoy the benefits of computer-aided design or wind tunnel testing. The original Elite drawings were by Peter Kirwan-Taylor. Frank Costin (brother of Mike, one of the co founders of Cosworth), at that time Chief Aerodynamic Engineer for the de Havilland Aircraft Company, contributed to the final design.

The Super 95 model had a more powerful engine with raised compression ratio and a stronger camshaft with five bearings. A limited number of Super 100 and Super 105 cars were made with Weber carburettors, for racing use.

Among the Elite's few faults was a resonant vibration at 4,000 rpm (where few drivers remained, on either street or track) and poor quality control, handicapped by an overly low price (resulting in Lotus losing money on every car produced) and, "perhaps the greatest mistake of all", offering it as a kit (with a substantial reduction in price and VAT), exactly the opposite of the ideal for a quality manufacturer. Many drive-train parts were highly stressed and required re-greasing at frequent intervals.

When production ended in 1963, 1,030 cars had been built. Other sources indicate that 1,047 were produced.

The test car cost £1,966 including taxes.

Legacy 
The ownership and history of the more than 1,000 Elites is maintained by the Lotus Elite World Register. There are several active clubs devoted to the Lotus Elite.

Motor sport

Like its siblings, the Elite was campaigned in numerous formulae, with particular success at Le Mans and the Nürburgring. The Elite won in its class six times at the 24 hour of Le Mans race as well as two Index of Thermal Efficiency wins. Les Leston, driving DAD10, and Graham Warner, driving LOV1, were noted UK Elite racers. In 1961, David Hobbs fitted a Hobbs Mecha-Matic 4-speed automatic transmission to an Elite, and became almost unbeatable in two years' racing – he won 15 times from 18 starts. New South Wales driver Leo Geoghegan won the 1960 Australian GT Championship at the wheel of a Lotus Elite. After winning Index of Thermal Efficiency prize, Lotus decided to go for an outright win at Le Mans in 1960. They built a one-off Elite, called the LX, with a  FPF engine, larger wheels, and other modifications. Unfortunately, the lead driver withdrew the night before the race, so the car did not have a chance to prove itself in competition.

Types 75 and 83 (1974–1982)

From 1974 to 1982, Lotus produced the considerably larger four-seat Type 75 and later Type 83 Elite. With this design Lotus sought to position itself upmarket and move away from its kit-car past. The Elite was announced in May 1974. It replaced the ageing Lotus Elan Plus 2.

The Elite has a shooting brake body style, with a glass rear hatch opening into the luggage compartment. The Elite's fibreglass bodyshell was mounted on a steel backbone chassis evolved from the Elan and Europa. It had 4-wheel independent suspension using coil springs. (The 907 engine had previously been used in Jensen-Healeys.) The 907 engine ultimately became the foundation for the 2.0 L and 2.2 L Esprit power-plants, the naturally aspirated 912 and the turbocharged 910. The Elite was fitted with a 4 or 5-speed manual transmission depending on the customer specifications. Beginning in January 1976, an automatic transmission was optional.

The Elite had a claimed drag co-efficient of 0.30 and at the time of launch, it was the world's most expensive four-cylinder car. The Elite's striking shape was designed by Oliver Winterbottom. He is quoted as saying that the basic chassis and suspension layout were designed by Colin Chapman, making the Elite and its sister design the Eclat the last Lotus road cars to have significant design input from Chapman himself.

The Elite was available in four main variations, set apart by equipment levels: 501, 502, 503, and later on 504.  

 501 - "Base" version.
 502 - Added air-conditioning to the base model.
 503 - Added air-conditioning and power-steering.
 504 - Added air-conditioning, power-steering and automatic transmission.

The Elite was the basis for the Eclat, and the later Excel 2+2 coupés.

In 1980 the Type 75 was replaced by the Type 83, also called the Elite Mark 2. This version received a larger  Lotus 912 engine. The chassis was now galvanised steel and the five speed BMC gearbox was replaced by a Getrag Type 265 unit. The vacuum-operated headlights of the earlier model were replaced with electrically operated units and the Elite was now fitted with a front spoiler, a new rear bumper and brake lights from the Rover SD1.

Elite concept
On 20 September 2010, Lotus unveiled photos of an Elite concept that was exhibited at the 2010 Paris Motor Show. The car was expected to go into production in 2014.

The car would have a front-mid engine layout to distribute weight evenly at all four wheels. An optional hybrid kinetic-energy recovery system would augment the V8 by feeding electricity generated by braking to motors in the transmission.

The car had a 2+2 body style and was to be marketed as a grand tourer.

The Elite project was cancelled in July 2012 after a take over of Lotus' then parent company Proton by DRB-Hicom which initiated a new cost effective business plan.

Notes

External links
Lotus type 14 Elite research and early history of company surrounding restoration of EB-1468

 

Elite
Grand tourers
Cars introduced in 1957
24 Hours of Le Mans race cars
1960s cars
1970s cars
1980s cars
Rear-wheel-drive vehicles
Coupés